Neo Swee Lin is a Singaporean actress who has appeared in several Asian films and theatres, notably in TV films and drama since the 1990s.

Early life
Born in Singapore, Neo Swee Lin has a law degree from National University of Singapore and trained at the Royal Scottish Academy of Music and Drama.

Theatre Works
Neo Swee Lin had appeared in over 40 theatre plays which included:  
 Dragon's Teeth Gate (1986)
 Three Children (1987)
 Three Children (1988)
 M. Butterfly (1989)
 The Moon is Less Bright (1990)
 Three Children (1992)
 Drunken Prawns (1994)
 The Glass Menagerie (1996)
 Beauty World - President Star Charity (1998)
 Ah Kong's Birthday Party (1998)
 Emily of Emerald Hill (1999)
 Emily of Emerald Hill (2000)
 Emily of Emerald Hill (2002)
 Hamlet (2002)
 For the Pleasure of Seeing Her Again (2004)
 2nd Link (2006)
 Homesick (2006)
 Cogito (2007)
 Postcards from Rosa (2007)
 Crazy Christmas (2007)
 Crazy Christmas (2008)
 Nadirah (2009)
 Poop (2009)
 Cinderel-lah! (2010)
 Crazy Christmas (2010)
 Emily of Emerald Hill (2011)
 Nadirah (2011)
 Crazy Christmas (2011)
 Cooling Off Day (2011)
 Cooling Off Day (2012)
 First Light (2012)
 Crazy Christmas (2012)
 Mama Looking for her Cat (2012)
 The Crucible (2013)
 Crazy Christmas (2013)
 Postcards from Rosa (2013)
 The House of Bernada Alba (2014)
 Hamlet (2014)
 First Light (2014)
 Crazy Christmas (2015)
 Hamlet (2016)
 Crazy Christmas (2016)
 Romeo & Juliet (2016)
 My Mother's Chest/妈妈的箱子 (2016)
 Medea (2017)
 No Parking on Odd Days and The Coffin is too Big for the Hole (2017)
 Club Tempest (2018)
 Half Lives (2018)
 Hamlet (2019)
 Homesick (2019)
 Crazy Christmas (2019)
 The Morning People (2020)
 Romeo & Juliet (2020)
 First Light (2020)
 Homesick (2021)
 Crazy Christmas (2021)

Local TV and Film Works

Her local TV and film work included: Where Got Problem, Random Acts, Really Something, Phua Chu Kang Pte Ltd (1997 - 2007), Drive: Life and Death, The Celebration and Cut.

International Works
Her international film and theatre work includes: Takeaway, The Letter (Lyric Hammersmith), Mail Order Bride (West Yorkshire Playhouse), 3 Japanese Women (Cockpit Theatre) and Trishaw.

Personal life
Neo first met her husband, Lim Kay Siu, a veteran theatre actor, on her first theatre play, Dragon's Teeth Gate in 1986. The two would act as a married couple four years later on the play, The Moon is Less Bright. They got married on 12 August 1992.

References

External links

Singaporean actresses
Singaporean people of Chinese descent
Singaporean stage actresses
Singaporean television actresses
Singaporean film actresses
Living people
Year of birth missing (living people)